Dakar Bourguiba University or  is located in Dakar, Senegal. It was founded in 1995.

References

External links 
Université Dakar Bourguiba Official Website

Universities in Senegal
French West Africa
Educational institutions established in 1995
1995 establishments in Senegal